Colonel Muffakham Jah Nawab Walashan Sahebzada Mir Karamath Ali Khan Siddiqi Bayafendi Bahadur (born 27 February 1939) is the son of Prince Azam Jah and Princess Durru Shehvar, and grandson of the last Nizam of Hyderabad.

An engineering college, Muffakham Jah College of Engineering and Technology, is named after him.

Personal life and Family 
He is married to Princess Esin of Turkey, has 2 sons and lives in Bayswater, London. Muffakham Jah had a brother Mukarram Jah.

See also
Muffakham Jah College of Engineering and Technology
Najaf Ali Khan - Cousin of Muffakham Jah

References

External links
Muffakham Jah College of Engineering and Technology official site

1936 births
Living people
Asaf Jahi dynasty
Hyderabadi Muslims
Indian people of Turkish descent
Indian philanthropists
People from Nice
People from Hyderabad State
20th-century Indian royalty
People educated at Harrow School
Alumni of Balliol College, Oxford